Johan Sems (1572 – January 1635), sometimes known as Johan Semp, was a Dutch cartographer, engineer and land surveyor.
He specialized in land reclamation and the building of dikes and fortifications.

Biography
Sems was born in Franeker (Friesland) in 1572 to Sem IJsbrandts and Claesgen Adriaens.
Sems is a patronym.
Sem IJsbrandts registered himself as a student at Leiden University. The family lived on the Marendorp Landzijde on the corner of the Lange Hooglandse Kerksteeg in Leiden. IJsbrandts committed suicide in 1584 due to alcoholism.
Johan Sems did not go to university himself. He had probably learned his skills in practice.

Little is known about his children.

Timeline
 In 1599, Sems became a silk merchant in Leeuwarden.
 1600: The book Practijck des lantmetens, a book written by Sems and Jan Pietersz. Dou, was published. The book was used at the engineering school started by Simon Stevin.
 1602: Sems was appointed land surveyor of Friesland.
 1603: Sems made a detailed map of Leeuwarden, which was engraved by Pieter Bast.
 1604-1608: Sems had the supervision over the building of the fortifications at Bourtange, Delfzijl and Bellingwolde.
 Sems bought several buildings in the city center of Leeuwarden.
 Around 1610, Sems moved to Bunde in Germany and he bought land in the Bunder Neuland, a polder that was created in 1604, with help from investors mainly from Amsterdam.
 1615: Sems and Johan de la Haye determined the exact location of the border between Groningen and Drenthe, the Semslinie. They took the Martini tower as a reference point, but later measurements have shown that it would miss the Martini tower by 532 meters.
 1616: From April 30, Sems was involved in land reclamation at Bredstedt. Later that year he designed the Christianshavn on Amager.
 1618: On January 6, while he was in Denmark, Sems was asked to come to the Netherlands because of a border dispute between Groningen and Drenthe. at Ter Apel.
 1621: Sems was back in Bunder Neuland. There were disputes between the Staten Generaal and Enno III, Count of East Frisia, about who had the rights in the polder.
 ca 1623: Sems was appointed dijkgraaf in the Bunder Neuland. In 1623, Jacob Matham produced an engraving of him, based on a portrait by Martin Faber.
 1623: Sems lived in Groningen and his book De arithmetische fundamenten was published in Emden.
 1625: The polder at Bredstedt was swept away by the sea during a storm.
 1626: Sems was given the task to map the area north of Pieterburen.
 1628: Sems got involved with the fortifications in eastern Groningen again.
 1629 en 1632: Sems's 'movable possessions' (excluding real estate) were seized due to default of payment.
 1634: Sems was in Dutch Brazil where he was involved as an engineer in the construction of fortifications at the conquered cities.
 1635: Sems suddenly died in Groningen somewhere between  1 January and 8 February. In 1636, his widow married the captain Jochum Bastijaen Coen.

Sems was married twice: first to Baerthe van Soutelande and then to Catharina Jans.

References

1572 births
1635 deaths
Dutch civil engineers
People from Franeker
17th-century Dutch cartographers